Louise Rålamb (1875–1967) was a Swedish court official. 

She served as överhovmästarinna (senior lady-in-waiting) at the Swedish Royal Court from 1938 to 1956.

References 

1875 births
1967 deaths
Mistresses of the Robes (Sweden)